Ladywell railway station is in Ladywell, in the London Borough of Lewisham in south east London, in Travelcard Zone 3.

The station and all trains serving it are operated by Southeastern. The Grade II station opened in 1857 and is in Ladywell Fields, adjacent to University Hospital, Lewisham.

History

Early years (1857-1922) 
The Mid-Kent line was built by the Mid-Kent and North Kent Junction Railway (MK&NKJR) and was opened on 1 January 1857 as far as Beckenham Junction (although it was not technically a junction as the West End of London and Crystal Palace Railway's line did not open until 3 May 1858).  From opening the line was worked by the South Eastern Railway (SER). Seven years later the MK&NKJR built an extension from a new junction station at New Beckenham to Croydon (Addiscombe Road) which again was operated by the SER.

In September 1866 a spur was opened from the north end of Ladywell station to the recently opened main line (which avoided Lewisham Junction station) which it joins at Parks Bridge Junction.

Almost all services from the station have terminated at Charing Cross or Cannon Street stations but between 1880 and 1884 a service worked between Croydon (Addiscombe Road) calling all stations to New Cross and then via a connection to the East London Line and terminating at Liverpool Street station.

In 1898 the South Eastern Railway and its bitter rivals the London Chatham and Dover Railway agreed to work as one railway company under the name of the South Eastern and Chatham Railway and Ladywell became an SECR station.

Southern Railway (1923-1947) 
Following the Railways Act 1921 (also known as the Grouping Act), Ladywell station became a Southern Railway station on 1 January 1923.

The Mid-Kent line was electrified with the (750 V DC third rail) system and electric services commenced on 28 February 1926.  Early electric services were worked by early Southern Railway 3-car Electric Multiple Unit trains often built from old SECR carriages.

On 30 June 1929 colour light signalling was introduced north of Ladywell.

British Railways (1948-1994) 
After World War II and following nationalisation on 1 January 1948, the station fell under the auspices of British Railways Southern Region.

Colour light signalling was introduced south of Ladywell (as far as New Beckenham) on 4 April 1971.

The privatisation era (1994-Present Day) 
On 13 October 1996 operation of the passenger services passed to Connex South Eastern. Services were subsequently operated by South Eastern Trains, and Southeastern since 1 April 2006.

Service 

The typical off-peak service in trains per hour is:
 4 tph to 

On Sundays, the station is served by a half-hourly service between Hayes and London Charing Cross via Lewisham.

Layout

Connections 
London Buses routes 122, 284, 484 and P4 serve the station.

References

External links 

Railway stations in the London Borough of Lewisham
Former South Eastern Railway (UK) stations
Railway stations in Great Britain opened in 1857
Railway stations served by Southeastern
Grade II listed buildings in the London Borough of Lewisham
Grade II listed railway stations
1857 establishments in England